Tang Can (born 12 June 1975) is a Chinese singer.

Biography
Tang was born in Lichuan, Hubei in 1975. Since childhood she developed an interest in singing and dancing. She is a graduate of Wuhan Conservatory of Music.

In 1996, she joined the Dongfang Song and Dance Troupe and performed in 1998 in the CCTV New Year's Gala. In 1999, she started to learn the arts of music from Jin Tielin.

On 13 September 2010, Tang joined the Chinese People's Liberation Army Naval Song and Dance Troupe.

In 2011, Tang disappeared. Some news reports said she was involved in corruption cases. In June 2016 it was reported that she had been released from prison after having served a sentence for corruption.

References

1975 births
Living people
Singers from Hubei
People from Enshi
Wuhan Conservatory of Music alumni
20th-century Chinese women singers
21st-century Chinese women singers